Frances Platt Townsend Lupton ( – ) was an American sculptor, painter, and miniaturist.  

She married lawyer Lawrence Lupton in 1803, but he died six months later. Their only child, Elizabeth, died at age 14.

Lupton was the first female sculptor admitted to the National Academy of Design, in 1827.  She created portrait busts of Governor Enos T. Throop and President James Madison; both works are unlocated.  She also exhibited paintings and miniatures at the Academy until 1831.  She was accomplished in many areas and is said to have known at least six languages.  

Frances Platt Townsend Lupton died on 5 March 1833.

References 

Created via preloaddraft
1779 births
1833 deaths
American women sculptors
American women painters
Miniature painting